Olsen Gang Gets Polished is a 2010 Danish 3D computer-animated comedy film directed by Jørgen Lerdam from a screenplay by . Produced by A. Film Production and Nordisk Film, it was the first animated film in the Olsen Gang film series. Olsen Gang Gets Polished was released on 14 October 2010. It was followed in 2013 by The Olsen Gang in Deep Trouble.

Voice cast 
Martin Buch as Egon Olsen
Nicolaj Kopernikus as Benny Frandsen
Esben Pretzmann as Kjeld Jensen
Annette Heick as Yvonne Jensen
Simon Jul Jørgensen as Allan
Mick Øgendahl as Johnny
Søren Sätter-Lassen as Hallandsen
Anders Matthesen as Detective Assistant Jensen
Jonas Schmidt as Detective Holm
Henrik Lykkegaard as Prime Minister Anders Fogh Rasmussen
Michael Carøe as the estate agent
Henrik Koefoed as member of parliament and prince consort
Vicki Berlin as DF speaker
Andreas Bo Pedersen as the opposition's speaker and Minister of Education
Jørgen Lerdam as the Queen
Kaja Kamuk as Ms. Jeppesen
Rune Tolsgaard as Mr. Jeppesen
Lin Kun Wu as the President of China
Zhao Li as the Chinese interpreter
Jens Jacob Tychsen as the chef
Silas Addington as Wonder Burger employee
Peter Oliver Hansen as TV presenter

See also 
Olsenbanden Jr.

References

External links 

Olsen Gang Gets Polished at danskefilm.dk (in Danish)
Olsen Gang Gets Polished at Scope (in Danish)

2010 films
2010 animated films
2010s children's animated films
Danish animated films
Danish comedy films
Danish children's films